Mimi Pinson is a 1924 French silent drama film directed by Théo Bergerat and starring Gabriel de Gravone, Simone Vaudry, and Maud Garden. It is based on a poem of the same name by Alfred de Musset.

Cast
 Gabriel de Gravone as Frédéric  
 Simone Vaudry as Mimi Pinson  
 Maud Garden as Musette  
 Armand Bernard as Coline  
 Louis Dory as Alfred de Musset  
 Marcelle Schmitt as Indiana 
 Sandy Petit as Madame Machard

References

Bibliography
 Philippe Rège. Encyclopedia of French Film Directors, Volume 1. Scarecrow Press, 2009.

External links 
 

1924 films
French drama films
French silent feature films
1924 drama films
1920s French-language films
Films based on works by Alfred de Musset
Films directed by Théo Bergerat
Films set in France
French black-and-white films
Silent drama films
1920s French films